Candida theae is a species of yeast in the genus Candida.  The species name means "tea".  It was first isolated from Indonesian tea drinks and in Quito from clay pots that contained chicha dating from 680 CE.

References

External links

Yeasts
theae
Fungi described in 2012
Fungi of South America
Fungi of Asia
Tea